The following public artworks have been installed in Oklahoma City, in the U.S. state of Oklahoma:

 Air Force Monument
 And Jesus Wept
 As Long as the Waters Flow
 Authentic Alaskan Totem Pole
 The Ballerina
 Bicentennial Monument
 Bob Hope
 Bust of Robert S. Kerr
 Casady School Abstract
 Centaurs and People
 Centennial Land Run Monument
 The Chimp
 Christ
 Christopher Norris Berry Memorial Fountain
 Collage
 The Conductor
 Curious Organism (2009)
 Destiny
 The Devon Mosaic: As Long as the Waters Flow
 Dwight David Eisenhower
 Espanola #21
 The Eternal Challenge
 Exclamation Point!
 Falling Water
 Family Tree Sculpture
 First Reader
 Foundation
 Fountain
 Galaxy
 Ganesia
 Gateway
 Girl with Rabbit
 Gorilla
 The Guardian
 Hand Pump
 Homecoming
 Inclined
 Investigation, Analysis and Publication
 Iron Feathers
 Lt. General Thomas P. Stafford
 Oklahoma City National Memorial
 Oklahoma's Native Son (2005), Will Rogers World Airport
 Orval O. "Sandy" Saunders
 Philodendron Dome
 Pioneer Preacher
 Pioneers of 1889
 Promenade
 Rosie the Riveter
 Run of 1889
 The Runners
 Seagulls
 Shakespeare
 Skydance Bridge
 Spirit of '76 Statuary
 Statue of Jim Thorpe
 Statue of Johnny Bench
 Statue of Liberty
 Statue of Mickey Mantle
 Statue of Stanley Draper
 Statue of Warren Spahn
 Sundial
 Ten Commandments Monument
 The Three Madonnas
 Totem #14
 Tree of Life
 Tribute to Range Riders
 Unity
 The Vela
 Vigil
 Water Music
 We Remember April 1995
 We Three
 Where the Earth Meets the Sky
 Will Rogers
 William Bill Gill, Jr.
 Wind Walker

References

Oklahoma City
Public art
Public art in Oklahoma